The 2007 Men's EuroHockey Nations Trophy was the second edition of the Men's EuroHockey Nations Trophy, the second level of the European field hockey championships organized by the European Hockey Federation. It was held in Lisbon, Portugal from 9 to 16 September 2007.

Whilst both Austria and Poland were promoted to the EuroHockey Championship in 2009, Poland defeated Austria to win the title. Poland, Austria, and Switzerland qualified from this event to the WorldHockey Olympic Qualifier Tournaments in 2008.

Qualified teams

Format
The eight teams were split into two groups of four teams. The top two teams advanced to the semi-finals to determine the winner in a knockout system. The bottom two teams play in a new group with the teams they did not play against in the group stage. The last two teams will be relegated to the 2009 EuroHockey Challenge I.

Results

Preliminary round

Pool A

Pool B

Fifth to eighth place classification

Pool C
The points obtained in the preliminary round against the other team are taken over.

First to fourth place classification

Semi-finals

Third place game

Final

Final standings

 Qualified for the 2009 EuroHockey Championship

 Relegated to the EuroHockey Nations Challenge I

See also
2007 Men's EuroHockey Nations Challenge I
2007 Men's EuroHockey Nations Championship

External links
European Hockey Federation website

EuroHockey Championship II
Men 2
International field hockey competitions hosted by Portugal
Eurohockey Nations Trophy Men
Eurohockey Nations Trophy Men
Sports competitions in Lisbon
2000s in Lisbon